The 1993 Kremlin Cup was a tennis tournament played on indoor carpet courts. It was the 4th edition of the Kremlin Cup, and was part of the World Series of the 1993 ATP Tour. It took place at the Olympic Stadium in Moscow, Russia, from 8 November through 14 November 1993.

Finals

Singles

 Marc Rosset defeated  Patrik Kühnen, 6–4, 6–3
It was Rosset's 3rd singles title of the year and 7th title overall.

Doubles

 Jacco Eltingh /  Paul Haarhuis defeated  Jan Apell /  Jonas Björkman, 6–1, ret
 It was Eltingh's 6th title of the year and 11th title overall. It was Haarhuis's 6th title of the year and 12th title overall.

References

External links
 Official website
 ITF tournament edition details

Kremlin Cup
Kremlin Cup
Kremlin Cup
Kremlin Cup
Kremlin Cup